Urusei Yatsura is a Japanese anime television series produced by Kitty Films that aired on Fuji Television from October 14, 1981 to March 19, 1986. It is based on the manga series of the same name by Rumiko Takahashi and was co-produced by Pierrot until episode 106, and Studio Deen for the rest of the series. The series was licensed in North America by AnimEigo in 1992, and released the series English subbed on VHS in October that year. Their license expired in 2011, and is currently licensed by Discotek Media, as announced during their panel at Otakon 2022.

The series was also syndicated in North America on KTEH in 1998, and BBC Choice aired a gag dub as part of a Japan TV Weekend block special as "Lum the Invader Girl" on August 5, 2000.

Music themes
Six opening theme songs and nine closing themes were used during the series.   was used as the opening theme for the first 77 episodes. It was replaced by Dancing Star for episodes 78 to 106.  was used for episodes 107 to 127, and Chance on Love was used for episodes 128 to 149. A total of 9 ending themes were used. The final two ending themes were Every Day for episodes 150 to 170, and Good Luck for the remainder of the series.

Series overview

Episodes

Season 1 (1981–82)

Season 2 (1983–84)

Season 3 (1984–85)

Season 4 (1985–86)

Specials

Broadcast and release
Urusei Yatsura aired on Fuji Television from October 14, 1981 to March 19, 1986. With the exceptions of episodes 10 and 11, the first 21 episodes were composed of two 11-minute segments. The first 106 episodes were directed by Mamoru Oshii and the remainder by Kazuo Yamazaki. Episode 193.5 "Urusei Yatsura Immediate Farewell Special - Shine!! Planet Uru Award" is a repeat of episode 44 "After You've Gone" with a special introduction and best episode countdown before the episode.

On December 10, 1983, the first VHS release of the series was made available in Japan.  The series was also released on fifty Laserdiscs. Another VHS release across fifty cassettes began on March 17, 1998 and concluded on April 19, 2000.  In 1987, 6,000 laserdisc box sets of the anime series costing  each were sold out, generating  in retail sales. Two DVD boxsets of the series were released between December 8, 2000 and March 9, 2001. These were followed by fifty individual volumes between August 24, 2001 and August 23, 2002. To celebrate the 35th anniversary of the anime a new HD transfer was created and released on Blu-ray in Japan. The first Blu-ray boxed set of the series was released on March 27, 2013, with the fourth box set released on March 26, 2014. To promote the Blu-ray, the anime was rebroadcast in high definition on Kids Station.

During 1992, the series was licensed for a North American release by AnimEigo. Their VHS release began in October of the same year and was among the first anime titles to receive a subtitled North American release. However the release schedule was erratic. An improvisational gag dub of the first and third episodes was broadcast on now-defunct BBC Choice channel on 5th/6th August 2000 as part of a Japan TV Weekend block special as "Lum the Invader Girl". AnimEigo later released the series on DVD. The series was available in box set form as well as individual releases. A total of 10 boxsets and 50 individual DVDs were released between March 27, 2001 and June 20, 2006. Each DVD and VHS contained Liner notes explaining the cultural references and puns from the series. In February 2011, AnimEigo announced that it would not renew their license to the series and that their DVDs would fall out of print on September 30, 2011. A fan group known as "Lum's Stormtroopers" convinced the San Jose public television station KTEH to broadcast subtitled episodes of the series in 1998. On July 31, 2022, during their panel at Otakon 2022, Discotek Media announced that they licensed the anime series.

Reception
In 1982, the anime series ranked sixth in Animage magazine's reader-voted Anime Grand Prix. The following year, the show climbed to fourth place. In 1984, the film Urusei Yatsura: Only You took fifth and the TV anime took sixth. While the TV series did not appear in the 1985 Anime Grand Prix, the film Beautiful Dreamer came in third. In 1986, the show reappeared in sixth place and the third film Remember My Love took third place. In 1987, the series went down to eighth place. The series received two additional awards as part of the Anime Grand Prix. In 1982, its theme song "Lum no Love Song" was voted best anime song. In 1983, the sixty-seventh episode was voted best episode. A 2019 NHK poll of 210,061 people saw Urusei Yatsura named Takahashi's fourth best animated work, with Beautiful Dreamer in fifth.

Christina Carpenter of THEM Anime Reviews praised the anime adaptation's characters and humor and noted the influence the series had on other series over the years. Carpenter summarized the series as an "Original and unapologetically Japanese classic that earns every star we can give" and awarded the series five stars out of five. In The Anime Encyclopedia: A Guide to Japanese Animation Since 1917, Jonathan Clements and Helen McCarthy viewed the anime as "a Japanese Simpsons for its usage of domestic humor and made note of AnimEigo's attention to providing notes for those unfamiliar with Japanese culture. They summarized the series as "a delight from beginning to end" that "absolutely deserves its fan favorite status." In reviewing AnimEigo's home video releases, Peter Nichols of The New York Times thought that the series was "relatively restrained" compared to their other releases. In a feature on the series for Anime Invasion, McCarthy recommended it as being "the first, the freshest and the funniest" of Takahashi's works and for its large cast, stories and use as a cultural and historical resource.

Writing in Anime from Akira to Princess Mononoke: Experiencing Contemporary Japanese Animation, Susan J. Napier dedicated several pages to discussion of the series, regarding it as "a pioneering work in the magical girlfriend genre." Napier contrasted the series to Western shows such as Bewitched and I Dream of Jeannie, highlighting their harmonious resolution to the chaos in comparison to Urusei Yatsuras "out of control" ending to each episode. Napier later compared the series to other magical girlfriend series such as Ah! My Goddess and Video Girl Ai. Fred Patten writing in Watching Anime, Reading Manga: 25 Years of Essays and Reviews credited the series with being the first program to inspire translations from fans. Patten also credited the series for introducing the phenomenon of using anime to advertise pop songs, claiming it was a deliberate decision by Kitty Films. Writing further about the series for the website Cartoon Research, Patten noted that the series was aimed at adults who could buy their own merchandise, as opposed to being subsidized by toy sales like many other shows at the time. Like Napier, Patten compared the series to Bewitched, but also to Sabrina the Teenage Witch.

See also
 Urusei Yatsura (film series)

Notes

References

External links
 

Urusei Yatsura
Episodes